Free Sh!t Men is a TV reality show devised by Stephen Wools and Josh Lefers that originated in the Melbourne, Australia. The show is produced by Channel V Australia, Big Dog Productions and WTFN. The show is known for its stunts, reality and comedic premises.

Channel V Australia picked up Free Sh!t Men for a 10-episode season in October 2011. Shows began airing weekly after The Riff on Saturday mornings and repeated throughout the week until December 2011.

The show features Stephen Wools and Josh Lefers on a series of challenges to acquire as many free items as possible. Each episode has a small and large challenge, such as Lunch, Tattoos, Sky Diving, Cars, Coffin and a Racehorse.

Series One overview

{| class="wikitable"
|-
! Episodes
! Small Item
! Acquired 
! Large Item
! Acquired
|-
| style="background-color: #FFFFFF; color: #100; text-align: center; top" | Episode One (2011)
| style="text-align: center; top" | Lunch
| style="text-align: center; top" | Yes
| style="text-align: center; top" | Car
| style="text-align: center; top" | Yes
|-
| style="background-color: #FFFFFF; color: #100; text-align: center; top" | Episode Two (2011)
| style="text-align: center; top" | Tarot Reading
| style="text-align: center; top" | Yes
| style="text-align: center; top" | Tattoo
| style="text-align: center; top" | Yes 
|-
| style="background-color: #FFFFFF; color: #100; text-align: center; top" | Episode Three (2011)
| style="text-align: center; top" | Glamour Photography
| style="text-align: center; top" | Yes
| style="text-align: center; top" | Coffin
| style="text-align: center; top" | Yes
|-
| style="background-color: #FFFFFF; color: #100; text-align: center; top" | Episode Four (2011)
| style="text-align: center; top" | Waxing
| style="text-align: center; top" | Yes
| style="text-align: center; top" | Sky Diving
| style="text-align: center; top" | Yes
|-
| style="background-color: #FFFFFF; color: #100; text-align: center; top" | Episode Five (2011)
| style="text-align: center; top" | Racehorse
| style="text-align: center; top" | Yes
| style="text-align: center; top" | Prostitute Part One
| style="text-align: center; top" | Unknown
|-
| style="background-color: #FFFFFF; color: #100; text-align: center; top" | Episode Six (2011)
| style="text-align: center; top" | Prostitute Part Two
| style="text-align: center; top" | Unknown
| style="text-align: center; top" | Butler
| style="text-align: center; top" | Yes
|-
| style="background-color: #FFFFFF; color: #100; text-align: center; top" | Episode Seven (2011)
| style="text-align: center; top" | Colonic Irrigation
| style="text-align: center; top" | Yes
| style="text-align: center; top" | Electric Beauty Therapy 
| style="text-align: center; top" | Yes
|-
| style="background-color: #FFFFFF; color: #100; text-align: center; top" | Episode Eight (2011)
| style="text-align: center; top" | Video Game
| style="text-align: center; top" | Yes
| style="text-align: center; top" | Money
| style="text-align: center; top" | Yes
|-
| style="background-color: #FFFFFF; color: #100; text-align: center; top" | Episode Nine (2011)
| style="text-align: center; top" | N/A
| style="text-align: center; top" | N/A
| style="text-align: center; top" | House
| style="text-align: center; top" | Yes
|-
| style="background-color: #FFFFFF; color: #100; text-align: center; top" | Episode TenHomebake Special (2011)
| style="text-align: center; top" | N/A
| style="text-align: center; top" | N/A
| style="text-align: center; top" | N/A
| style="text-align: center; top" | N/A
|-
|}

References

2010s Australian reality television series